MIEE may refer to:

 Member of the Institution of Electrical Engineers
 Moscow Institute of Electronic Engineering, the English official name of National Research University of Electronic Technology in the 1990s.